Gil de Kermadec (1922 — 27 May 2011) was a French tennis player.

Active on tour in the 1940s and 1950s, de Kermadec was the son of painter Eugène de Kermadec. He made the singles third round of the 1951 French Championships and featured in multiple editions of the Wimbledon Championships.

In the early 1960s he was appointed National Technical Director for the French Tennis Federation.

Footage that he captured on the courts of Roland Garros for a series of instructional videos later featured in the 2018 documentary John McEnroe: In the Realm of Perfection.

References

External links
 

1922 births
2011 deaths
French male tennis players
20th-century French people